Culcheth and Glazebury is a civil parish in the Borough of Warrington, ceremonial county of Cheshire and historic county of Lancashire, England, northeast of the town of Warrington.  It contains eleven buildings that are recorded in the National Heritage List for England as designated listed buildings.  Other than the villages of Culcheth and Glazebury, the parish is rural.  The A574 road runs through it, and two milestones adjacent to the road are listed.  In addition a parish boundary stone on the B5207 road is listed.  The church in Glazebury is also listed; all the other listed buildings are related to houses or farms.

Key

Buildings

See also
Listed buildings in Croft
Listed buildings in Wigan
Listed buildings in Salford
Listed buildings in Rixton-with-Glazebrook
Listed buildings in Birchwood

References
Citations

Sources

Listed buildings in Warrington
Lists of listed buildings in Cheshire